Dasho Tshering Wangchuk is a Bhutanese jurist who served as the Chief Justice of the Supreme Court of Bhutan from 2014 to 2019. In 2018, Wanghuck served as the interim Head of Government of Bhutan, when serving as the Chief Advisor of the Interim Government, following the dissolution of the Bhutanese National Assembly in preparation of elections.

Career
Dasho Tshering Wangchuk has a master's degree in international law from George Washington University (LLM '03), and another degree in law from the University of Delhi. Wangchuk began his career as a judicial officer in 1987, serving as an apprentice to the judges of the High Court. From 1990 to 1995 he served as a Second Lieutenant in the Royal Bhutan Army. He served as a judicial officer in the High Court from 1993 to 1999. From 2006 to 2010 he served in Samdrup Jongkhar as district court judge. In 2010 he was promoted to justice of the High Court. In November 2014, he was appointed Chief Justice of the country by the King.

Chief Advisor
On August 1, 2018, Bhutan's lower house dissolved in preparation for general elections. On August 9, the king appointed an interim government, headed by Wangchuk as Chief Advisor. On August 11, members of the Interim Government were assigned portfolios. Wangchuk was responsible for the ministries of Home, Cultural Affairs, and Foreign affairs.

References

Date of birth missing (living people)
Living people
Bhutanese politicians
Chief justices
George Washington University Law School alumni
Delhi University alumni
Year of birth missing (living people)